Ubaldo Caccianemici (died 1171) was an Italian cardinal and cardinal-nephew of Pope Lucius II, his cousin who elevated him in May or June 1144.

Before his elevation to the cardinalate he was canon regular of the Congregation of S. Frediano in Lucca. He was elevated to the cardinalate by his uncle shortly after his election to the papacy. He subscribed the papal bulls as Cardinal-Priest of S. Croce in Gerusalemme between 28 June 1144 and 12 September 1170. After the double papal election, 1159 he supported the obedience of Pope Alexander III and served as his legate at the council of Saint-Jean-de-Losne in 1162. He probably became protopriest of the Sacred College in 1158 or 1166.

References

External links

Bibliography

J.M. Brixius, Die Mitglieder des Kardinalkollegiums von 1130-1181, Berlin 1912, p. 51 no. 4 and p. 103-104 no. 111

12th-century Italian cardinals
Cardinal-nephews
1171 deaths
Year of birth unknown